Dispirit is an American black metal band from Oakland, California.

Discography 
Demos
 Rehearsal at Oboroten (2010)
 111112 (2012)
 Separation (2015)
 Enantiodromian Birth (2018)

Band members 
 John Gossard (formerly Weakling, Asunder, The Gault etc.) (2000–present) – guitars, vocals
 Todd Meister (Serpents of Dawn) (2009–present) – bass
 Greg Brace (Wild Hunt, Dimesland) (2017–present) – guitar
Harley Burkhart (Wild Hunt, The Samps, Dimesland) (2017–present) – drums

Former members 
 Ryan Jencks (Azog/SIXES/Summons, formerly Crash Worship, Physics, Deathroes, Burmese etc.) (2012–2017) - guitar, noise
 Trevor Deshryver (Lycus, ex-Deafheaven, ex-Whirr etc.) (2014–2017) - drums
Peter Blair (2000–2013) - drums
 Nikhil Sarma (2009–2011) - guitar

Session/Live members 
 Sean McGrath (2012) - guitar
 Jason Bursese (2013) - drums
 Matt Luque (2004–2005) - guitar
 Jody Hunt (2008–2009) - bass

References

External links 
 www.dispirit.org

American black metal musical groups
Musical groups from the San Francisco Bay Area